Jo-Wilfried Tsonga was the defending champion, but lost in the semifinals to Viktor Troicki.
Gilles Simon won in the final 7–5, 6–3, against Viktor Troicki.

Seeds
The top four seeds receive a bye into the second round.

Draw

Finals

Top half

Bottom half

External links
 Main Draw
 Qualifying Draw

Singles
PTT Thailand Open - Singles
 in Thai tennis